Filderstadt (Swabian: Fildorsdadd) is a town in the district of Esslingen in Baden-Württemberg in southern Germany. It is located approximately 13 km south of Stuttgart.

Filderstadt is located next to the Stuttgart Airport and the new Trade Fair. Line S2 of the Stuttgart S-Bahn terminates at Filderstadt station.
 
Filderstadt was created as a town in 1975 from five smaller villages called Bernhausen, Bonlanden, Plattenhardt, Sielmingen and Harthausen.

From 1978 to 2005, it played host to the Porsche Tennis Grand Prix, a WTA Tier II event.

Princess Claire of Luxembourg was born here on 21 March 1985.

German writer Michael Ende, author of The Neverending Story, died in Filderstadt in 1995.

Economy
Contact Air once had its headquarters in Filderstadt.

Notable people

 Eduard Mörike (1804–1875), Swabian poet, held in Bernhäuser Jakobuskirche his first sermon and lived during his time as a vicar in 1829 a few months in the Plattenhardt rectory
 Michael Ende (1929–1995), writer of books for children, (Die unendliche Geschichte, Momo), died in Bonlanden (Filderklinik) 
 Roman Herzog (1934–2017), politician (CDU), former German President, lived during his tenure as interior minister of Baden-Württemberg (1980–1983) from 1978 five years in the Ludwigstraße (Ludwig street) in Bernhausen
 Paul Maar (born 1937), writer and illustrator, taught in the 1970s for several years as an art teacher at the Eduard-Spranger-Gymnasium in Bernhausen
 Laura Siegemund (born 1988), tennis player
 Helen Grobert (born 1992), cyclist
 Marvin Plattenhardt (born 1992), soccer player at Hertha BSC
 Leonie Adam (born 1993), trampoline gymnast

Twin towns – sister cities

Filderstadt is twinned with:

 Dombasle-sur-Meurthe, France
 Oschatz, Germany
 Poltava, Ukraine
 Selby, England, United Kingdom
 La Souterraine, France

References

Towns in Baden-Württemberg
Esslingen (district)
Württemberg